Gymnites is a genus of ammonoid cephalopod from the Middle Triassic belonging to the ceratitid family Gymnitidae. These nektonic carnivores lived during the Triassic period, Anisian age.

Species

 Gymnites aghdarbandensis Krystyn and Tatzreiter 1991
 Gymnites asseretoi Tozer 1972
 Gymnites billingsi Bucher 1989
 Gymnites calli Smith 1914
 Gymnites compressus Tozer 1994
 Gymnites evolutus Shevyrev 1995
 Gymnites humboldti Mojsisovics 1882
 Gymnites incultus Beyrich 1867
 Gymnites machangpingensis Zhao and Wang 1974
 Gymnites perplanus Meek 1877
 Gymnites petilus Wang and Chen 1979
 Gymnites procerus Tozer 1994
 Gymnites robinsoni Shevyrev 1995
 Gymnites toulai Arthaber 1914
 Gymnites tozeri Bucher 1992
 Gymnites tregorum Silberling and Nichols 1982
 Gymnites vastesellatus Welter 1915

Description
The shell of Gymnites is evolute, generally smooth, with a wide umbilicus. Whorls are moderately embracing, whorl section oval and somewhat compressed. The outer whorl may be costate or have rows of nodes, or both. The suture is ammonitic with a wide bifurcated ventral lobe and two lateral lobes on either side.

Taxonomic relation
Hyatt and Smith (1905, p. 115)included Gymnites in the Gymnitidae along with Ophiceras, Flemingites, and Xenaspis, genera since assigned elsewhere, and included the Gymnitidae in the suborder Ceratitoidea (now the superfamily Ceratitaceae). Smith (1932, p. 30) shows Gymenites derived from Xenaspis and giving rise to the Pinacoceratidae.

The American Treatise (Part L, 1957) also includes Gymnites in the Gymnitidae, along with mainly descendant forms such as Buddhaites, Japonites, and variations on Gymnites itself, but instead included the Gymnitidae in the Pinacocerataceae which is consistent with Smith's derivation of the Pinacoceratidae from Gymnites''.

Distribution
Fossils of species within this genus have been found in the Triassic of Afghanistan, Canada, China, Hungary, Iran, Russia, Switzerland, Turkey, United States.

References

 Alpheus Hyatt and James Perrin Smith, 1905. The Triassic Cephalopod General of America. United States Geological Survey Professional Paper no. 40.
 James Perrin Smith, 1932. Lower Triassic Ammonoids of North America. U.S. Geological Survey PP 167.
 Treatise on Invertebrate Paleontology, Part L, Ammonoidea. Geol Soc. of America and Univ. Kansas Press, 1957. p. L184.

Ammonites of Europe
Triassic ammonites
Anisian life
Gymnitidae
Ammonite genera